Anatoma keenae is a species of minute sea snail, a marine gastropod mollusk or micromollusk in the family Anatomidae.

Distribution
This marine species occurs off the Gulf of California, Mexico.

References

External links
 To Encyclopedia of Life
 To World Register of Marine Species
 

Anatomidae
Gastropods described in 1970